Valeriy Mykolayovych Voskonyan (born 6 April 1994) is a Ukrainian footballer who plays as a goalkeeper for FC Uzhhorod.

Career
In 2016, Voskonyan signed for Armenian top flight side Pyunik from Mykolaiv in the Ukrainian second division.

In 2019, he signed for Finnish club VPS.

In 2020, he signed for Krystal in the Ukrainian second division from Armenian second division team Aragats.

References

External links
 
 

1994 births
Living people
People from Mykolaiv Oblast
Ukrainian people of Armenian descent
Ukrainian footballers
Ukrainian expatriate footballers
Association football goalkeepers
Ukrainian First League players
Kakkonen players
Veikkausliiga players
Armenian Premier League players
MFC Mykolaiv players
FC Pyunik players
Vaasan Palloseura players
FC Krystal Kherson players
FC Uzhhorod players
Ukrainian expatriate sportspeople in Finland
Ukrainian expatriate sportspeople in Armenia
Expatriate footballers in Finland
Expatriate footballers in Armenia